Terralonus californicus, the intertidal or beach jumping spider, is a species of jumping spider in the family Salticidae. It is found in the United States. It is one of the few spiders known to regularly inhabit beaches.

References

Further reading

External links

 

Salticidae
Articles created by Qbugbot
Spiders described in 1888